The following lists events that happened during 1956 in Australia.

Incumbents

Monarch – Elizabeth II
Governor-General – Sir William Slim
Prime Minister – Robert Menzies
Chief Justice – Sir Owen Dixon

State Premiers
Premier of New South Wales – Joseph Cahill
Premier of Queensland – Vince Gair
Premier of South Australia – Thomas Playford IV
Premier of Tasmania – Robert Cosgrove
Premier of Victoria – Henry Bolte
Premier of Western Australia – Albert Hawke

State Governors
Governor of New South Wales – Sir John Northcott
Governor of Queensland – Sir John Lavarack
Governor of South Australia – Sir Robert George
Governor of Tasmania – Sir Ronald Cross, 1st Baronet
Governor of Victoria – Sir Dallas Brooks
Governor of Western Australia – Sir Charles Gairdner

Events
 August - The Murray River flooded (the biggest flood in recorded history), affecting many towns near the river.
 22 November – The 1956 Summer Olympics opened in Melbourne.  The opening ceremony was held at the Melbourne Cricket Ground with 107,700 people watching.

Arts and literature

 William Dargie wins the Archibald Prize for his portrait of Albert Namatjira
 Quadrant literary magazine is founded, edited by James McAuley

Television
 16 September – Australia's first TV station TCN-9 begins regular transmission in Sydney
 4 November - HSV-7 begins as Melbourne's first TV Station.
 5 November – The first TV station of the Australian Broadcasting Commission is launched; ABN-2 Sydney.

Sport
 8 September – John Russell wins his first men's national marathon title, clocking 2:26:37.8 in Melbourne.
 Melbourne Cup winner in 1956 was Evening Peal, ridden by George Podmore Trained by E.D.Lawson
 New South Wales wins the Sheffield Shield
 Kurrewa IV takes line honours and Solo wins on handicap in the Sydney to Hobart Yacht Race
 New South Wales Rugby League premiership: St George defeated Balmain
 Victorian Football League premiership: Melbourne defeated Collingwood
 Australian Men's Tennis Championship was won by Lew Hoad from NSW aged 22
 Australian Women's Tennis Championship was won by Miss Mary Carter

Births
 9 January – Bill Leak, editorial cartoonist (d. 2017)
 20 January – Richard Morecroft, English-Australian journalist
 29 January – Ian Davies, basketball player (d. 2013)
 6 February – Ken Lorraway, triple jumper (d. 2007)
27 February – Andrea Mitchell, Western Australian politician and sports administrator (d. 2020)
 7 March – David Koch, television personality
 9 March – Steve Vizard, actor
 9 May – Jana Wendt, journalist
 22 May – Peter Ali, basketball player
 15 July – Steve Mortimer, rugby league footballer
 21 July – Andy Campbell, basketball player
 31 July – Ernie Dingo, actor
 12 August – Suzanne Twelftree, Paralympic wheelchair tennis player and powerlifter (d. 2019)
 17 August – John Kosmina, soccer player and manager
 17 September – Ross Glendinning, Australian Rules footballer
 17 September – Yunupingu, musician (Yothu Yindi) and community leader (d. 2013)
 2 October ~ Peter Evans 
 16 October – Martin Sacks, actor
 7 November
 Michael Wooldridge, politician
 Gordon McLeod, basketball player and assistant coach.
 14 November – John Anderson, politician
 23 November – Shane Gould, swimmer

Deaths
 21 March – Fanny Durack, (b. 1889), swimmer
 29 May – Frank Beaurepaire, (b. 1891), swimmer and politician
 12 July – John Hayes, (b. 1868), Premier of Tasmania

See also
 List of Australian films of the 1950s

References

 
Australia
Years of the 20th century in Australia